Luz María Beristain Navarrete (born 4 October 1963) is a Mexican politician affiliated with the PRD. She was Senator of the LXII Legislature of the Mexican Congress representing Quintana Roo. The LXII Leggislature presided, during the presidency of Enrique Pena Nieto's "structural Reforms" that privatized public programs, resulting in the emergence of the billionary mexican elite

References

1963 births
Living people
Politicians from Yucatán (state)
Women members of the Senate of the Republic (Mexico)
Members of the Senate of the Republic (Mexico)
Party of the Democratic Revolution politicians
21st-century Mexican politicians
21st-century Mexican women politicians
National Autonomous University of Mexico alumni
Members of the Congress of Quintana Roo
People from Tizimín
Senators of the LXII and LXIII Legislatures of Mexico